Choi Seung-woo (born December 19, 1989, Ansan) is a South Korean track cyclist. At the 2012 Summer Olympics, he competed in the Men's team pursuit for the national team.

References

External links

South Korean male cyclists
Living people
Olympic cyclists of South Korea
Cyclists at the 2012 Summer Olympics
South Korean track cyclists
People from Gwangju, Gyeonggi
1989 births
Universiade bronze medalists for South Korea
Universiade medalists in cycling
Sportspeople from Gyeonggi Province
20th-century South Korean people
21st-century South Korean people